is a railway station on the Sōbu Main Line (Chūō-Sōbu Line) in Edogawa, Tokyo, Japan, operated by the East Japan Railway Company (JR East).

Station layout

Platforms

History
Koiwa Station opened on 25 May 1899.

References

External links

 Koiwa Station information (JR East) 

Railway stations in Japan opened in 1899
Sōbu Main Line
Chūō-Sōbu Line
Stations of East Japan Railway Company
Railway stations in Tokyo
1899 establishments in Japan